Callicarpa rubella is a species of beautyberry native to Southeast Asia. It is a shrub that produces pink or purple flowers followed by dark-purple berries. The berries are actually drupes. It is grown in gardens as an ornamental plant. The fruit attracts wildlife such as birds.

External links
 Callicarpa rubella picture
 Callicarpa rubella info

rubella